Matome Kopano Chiloane is a South African politician who has been the Member of the Executive Council (MEC) for Education in Gauteng since October 2022. He has been a Member of the Gauteng Provincial Legislature since March 2018, representing the African National Congress. He formerly served as the chairperson of the education committee in the legislature. Chiloane is also the provincial chairperson of the African National Congress Youth League.

Career
In August 2014, Chiloane was elected chairperson of the African National Congress Youth League in Gauteng.

On 20 March 2018, he was sworn in as a Member of the Gauteng Provincial Legislature. He replaced former premier Paul Mashatile.

Chiloane was elected to a full term in the 2019 provincial election. He was appointed chairperson of the education committee in the legislature.

On 7 October 2022, Chiloane was appointed MEC for Education.

References

External links

Living people
Year of birth missing (living people)
People from Gauteng
Members of the Gauteng Provincial Legislature
African National Congress politicians